Kadavu (pronounced ), with an area of , is the fourth largest island in Fiji, and the largest island in the Kadavu Group, a volcanic archipelago consisting of Kadavu, Ono, Galoa and a number of smaller islands in the Great Astrolabe Reef. Its main administrative centre is Vunisea, which has an airport, a high school, a hospital, and a government station, on the Namalata Isthmus where the island is almost cut in two. The population of the island province was 10,167 at the most recent census in 2007.

Kadavu Island belongs to Kadavu Province.

Geography 

The island is almost sliced in two at the Vunisei Isthmus (Naceva) and the narrow Namalata Isthmus, which separates Namalata Bay on the northern coast from Galoa Harbour on the southern coast. Within Galoa Harbour lie Galoa Island and the tiny islet of Tawadromu. Kadavu is characterized by its rugged and mountainous terrain.

Flora and fauna 
Kadavu still has 75% of its original rainforest cover and a rich bird diversity, including four species endemic to the island, the velvet dove, the crimson shining-parrot, the Kadavu honeyeater and the Kadavu fantail, in addition to several endemic subspecies (such as a subspecies of the island thrush). Offshore, stringing around the south, east and then away to the north, is the Great Astrolabe Reef, a large barrier reef that is one of Fiji's premier scuba diving resorts.

A  area covering the interior of the eastern part of the island is the East Kadavu Important Bird Area. It contains populations of the vulnerable Shy Ground-dove, Crimson Shining-parrot and Collared Petrel.

Economy and culture 

Kadavu is one of the least developed areas of Fiji. There are few roads, and the local economy is largely dependent on subsistence farming, supplemented by exports to Viti Levu. The main commercial crop is yaqona (known as Kava around the Pacific islands). There are no banks on Kadavu.  Tourism is becoming popular, however, with snorkeling and diving among the major attractions.  The chiefly system in Kadavu gives much greater authority to local chiefs than most other areas in Fiji, where local chiefs are more often subservient to a few "paramount chiefs."

On 17 December 2005, Ratu Josateki Nawalowalo, Chairman of the Kadavu Provincial Council, announced major development plans to build roads throughout the island and to upgrade jetties, improving Kadavu's links with the mainland.  He revealed that much of the finance would be provided by the government of Taiwan.

History 
He was followed in 1799 by the United States vessel Ann & Hope, skippered by C. Bently en route from Australia. In 1827, French commander Dumont d'Urville nearly shipwrecked  on the reef that now bears the vessel's name. The island later became home to beche-de-mer traders, as well as whalers from Sydney, Australia, and New England in the United States. Galoa Harbour became a regular port of call for vessels carrying mail between Sydney, San Francisco, and Auckland.

Origin of the Kadavu People 
Most Kadavuans are not sure where their ancestors may have originated from. Some say that they never travelled from other places but were always present on the island. While some have various theories. However, a well-known linguist feels that the people of Kadavu may have come from the East, given the similarity of words with the southernmost part of the Lauan group of islands and the core belief that Kadavu's ancestors settled from the East, as opposed to the rest of Fiji where the movement was Westwards. It can also be seen that  Kadavuans generally possess Polynesian attributes, which may further add to the belief. Yet, the notion is debatable as Kadavu and Lau never had any affiliation in the past, be it tribal or provincial. It has only been in the last decade or so that the two provinces coined the term "Yanu" (meaning island or islanders), to forge a relationship.
However the term "Yanu" is also called between Lau, Lomaiviti and Yasawa groups. Origin was that these islands never had a previous relationship and in Suva, these islands (Yanuyanu, later shortened to Yanu) were called between the smaller islands compared to Vitilevu and Vanualevu.
The most famous theory is that the Kadavu people came from different parts of Fiji through Beqa and crossed through Deuba village.

Pride of Kadavu 
Kadavu Island is nicknamed "Bird land" and rightly so as it has a number of rare birds that are endemic to the island. These birds have survived on Kadavu due to the richness and abundance of natural resources as well as the climatic conditions of the island. The most famous bird is the Kadavu crimson shining-parrot, which stands out from other parrots in the country, with its blue-collar at the back of the neck. The Kadavu fantail, the whistling dove and the honeyeater are amongst other rare birds found only in Kadavu.

Additionally,  locals say that Kadavu is the most beautiful island, it grows the best and strongest kava,  biggest dalo, largest fish, and sweetest mangoes. 
So far Kadavu has had the most Hibiscus Queens. Lenora Qereqeretabua, Lynda Tabuya, Mere Nailatikau, Sera Tikotikoivatu, and now Marie Falls whose mother is from Kadavu.

Demographics 
The Kadavu archipelago sits on the earthquake belt and the cyclone path of Fiji. Kadavu has weathered many earthquakes and cyclones in the past. Along with the isolation and seclusion from the mainland, the people have struggled more than most provinces in Fiji. History has proven that people who go through difficulties and trying times can develop a resilient attitude towards life. Thus, these challenges have shaped and moulded Kadavuans to be amongst the most intelligent and high achieving people in Fiji. They can be seen at all top-level positions in the country and have an undeniable knack for breaking into new grounds and frontiers. The beautiful "Kadavu House" in the capital city of Suva is a testimony of their achievement. Kadavu is the only province in Fiji that hits the million dollar mark and more, as the people are the most generous givers in the country. The people are fondly called "Me Damu" (rams/goats) by their notorious "Tauvus" particularly the Stallion province of Nadroga and the Rooster province of Ra with whom they share fierce friendly rivalries. Wherever in the world, they may be, Kadavuans are deeply connected to their island province, and are intensely proud of their identity as a "Kai Kadavu."

Kadavuans 
Well-known Kadavu names include:
 Kaliopate Tavola, former Foreign Minister
 Konisi Yabaki of Tiliva village, former Forests and Fisheries Minister
 Ms Lynda Tabuya also from Tiliva village, current MP and Opposition Whip 
 Dr Masi brothers, also from Tiliva village
 Sakeasi Waqanivavalagi, former Minister and PSC Chairman  
 James Ah-Koy, former Minister for Finance, senator, and businessman
 Apaitia Seru, former Attorney General, Minister for Justice and Chief Magistrate
 Akuila Yabaki, former lawyer and Attorney-General the Kelemedi Bulewa of Ravitaki Village, Methodist minister and political activist
 Manu Korovulavula of Naikorokoro Village, former Senator, Minister for Transport, former CEO of Land Transport Authority, Chairman of the Fiji Sports Council, Music composer and singer and was leader a famous Fijian band the Southern Brothers, Officer of the Order of Fiji in the Republic of Fiji Honors List, co-founder of the Fiji Composers Association and Fiji Performing Right Association Limited.
 Epineri Vula of Tawava Village (Yawe), former lawyer, Supreme Court judge and senator, 
 Jeremaia Naivalurua II and his sons, Senator Mataiasi Waqavesi Naivalurua and Apolosa Laburuburu Naivalurua
 Senator Sela Donumaitoga Nanovo
 Josateki Nawalowalo, Chairman of the Kadavu Provincial Council and of the Fiji Kava Council.  
 Jesoni Vitusagavulu, Fiji's former Ambassador to the United States.
 Colonel Matereti Sarasau of Dagai Village, 
 Sitiveni Ratuva of Yale Village
 Inoke Nabulivou of Dravuwalu Village, past President of the Methodist Church of Fiji and Rotuma.
 Mosese Tikoitoga, Commander of the Republic of Fiji Military Forces

Transport
Ferry service by Patterson Brothers Shipping Company LTD connects Kadavu to Viti Levu.
Also Goundar Shipping Limited (Lomaiviti Princess) and Liaona Shipping Limited.

References

 Fiji. By Korina Miller, Robyn Jones, Leonardo Pinheiro – 2003– Page 230
 Oceania by Australian National Research Council, University of Sydney, Published 1930, Editors: Apr. 1930-Mar. 1931, A.R. Radcliffe Brown; Sept. 1931-Dec. 1932, R. Firth; Mar. 1933– A.P. Elkin. Pages 145 to 148. Original from the University of Michigan.
 Scottish Geographical Magazine By Royal Scottish Geographical Society, Published 1999, Pages 123 to 126.
 Sofer, Michael (2007) Yaqona and the Peripheral Economy Revisited, Asia Pacific Viewpoint, Vol. 48(2), pp. 234–249. Sofer, Michael (2009) Twenty Years of Change in the Fijian Periphery: The Case of the Kadavu Island, Fiji, Singapore Journal of Tropical Geography, Vol. 30, pp. 343–357. Sofer, M. (2015) Kadavu Island: Adaptation and stagnation in the Fijian periphery, Miscellanea Geographica: Regional Studies on Development, Vol. 19(2), pp. 14–20. DOI: 10.1515/mgrsd-2015-0006 

  BirdLife International (2012). "Prosopeia splendens". IUCN Red List of Threatened Species. Version 2013.2. International Union for Conservation of Nature. Retrieved 26 November 2013.

External links 

 

 Information on Kadavu.
 General Information on Kadavu.

Kadavu Group
Islands of Fiji
Important Bird Areas of Fiji